Mission: Impossible is a 1991 adventure video game developed by Distinctive Software and published by Konami.

Gameplay
Mission: Impossible is a game in which the player assembles a team of four agents with different skills and abilities.

Reception
Charles Ardai reviewed the game for Computer Gaming World, and wrote that: "A player looking for a good thriller or espionage game would do better to get Countdown or Covert Action instead. A player looking for a good Mission: Impossible adventure is directed, with regret, to the late-night listings of the current TV Guide."

Reviews
Game Player's PC Entertainment
Power Play - 1992-02

References

1991 video games
Adventure games
Distinctive Software games
DOS games
DOS-only games
Mission: Impossible video games
Video games based on television series
Video games developed in Canada